Demetri Evan Martin (Dimitrios Evangelos Martin; born May 25, 1973)  is an American comedian, actor, writer, director, cartoonist and musician. He was a contributor on The Daily Show. In stand-up, he is known for his deadpan delivery, playing his guitar for jokes, and his satirical cartoons. He starred as Ice Bear in Cartoon Network's We Bare Bears.

Early life 
Martin was born into a Greek-American family in New York City on May 25, 1973, the son of Lillian (1951–2019) and Greek Orthodox priest Dean C. Martin (1948–1994). His grandparents migrated from Sparta and Crete. He grew up in Toms River, New Jersey, and has a younger brother named Spyro and a younger sister named Christene. As a teenager, he worked at his family’s diner in Beachwood near the Jersey Shore. He attended Toms River High School North and graduated in 1991.

Martin graduated from Yale University in 1995 with a B.A in History. During his time there, he wrote a 224-word poem as a project for a fractal geometry class, which became a well-known palindromic poem. He was also a member of the Anti-Gravity Society, whose members juggle objects on Sunday evenings on Yale's Old Campus.

Although Martin was admitted to Harvard Law School, he instead decided to attend New York University School of Law upon receiving a full scholarship. Martin withdrew from law school before the start of his final year, opting to pursue comedy over obtaining his Juris Doctor degree.

Career 
Shortly after leaving law school, Martin started performing stand-up in the summer of 1997. In 2001, Martin caught his first big break in stand-up comedy when he appeared on Comedy Central's stand-up showcase Premium Blend. At the 2003 Edinburgh Festival Fringe he won the Perrier Award with his show If I.... The show was turned into a BBC television special in 2004. From 2003 to 2004, Martin wrote for Late Night with Conan O'Brien. In 2004, Martin had his own Comedy Central Presents stand-up special. His special was divided into three parts. In the first, he performed in a traditional stand-up comedy fashion. In the second segment, he used humorous drawings as visual aids, which would serve either as the punchline or a background. During the third segment, he played the guitar and put on a pseudo-play where he would strum his guitar while alternating between playing harmonica and talking; some of his comedian friends, wearing fairy and dragon costumes, acted according to the story he was telling, detailing the magical land from where his jokes came. Martin's mother and grandmother also appeared.

Starting in late 2005, he was credited as a contributor on The Daily Show, on which he appeared as the named "Senior Youth Correspondent" and hosted a segment called "Trendspotting". He used this segment to talk about so-called hip trends among youth such as hookahs, wine, guerilla marketing and Xbox 360. A piece about social networking featured his profile on Myspace. On March 22, 2007, Martin made another appearance on The Daily Show, talking about the Viacom lawsuit against Google and YouTube. He is no longer a Daily Show contributor as of 2014.  Before starting at The Daily Show, he was offered to audition for Saturday Night Live but turned it down due to the seven year commitment.

He has recorded a comedy album titled These Are Jokes, which was released on September 26, 2006. This album also features Saturday Night Live member Will Forte and stand-up comedian Leo Allen.
Martin returned to The Daily Show on March 22, 2006, as the new Youth Correspondent, calling his segment "Professional Important News with Demetri Martin". In 2007, he starred with Faryl Millet, a comedian and actress better known for her show Fancy Nancy's Funny Hour, in a Fountains of Wayne music video for "Someone to Love" as Seth Shapiro, and Millet as Beth Mackenzie. Both of them are characters in the song. He also starred in the video for the Travis single "Selfish Jean", in which he wears multiple T-shirts with lyrics written on them.
On September 2, 2007, Martin appeared on the season finale of the HBO series Flight of the Conchords. He appeared as a keytar player named Demetri.
He also had a part in the movie The Rocker (2008) starring Rainn Wilson. Martin played the part of the videographer when the band in the movie was making their first music video.

In 2009, he hosted and starred in his own television show called Important Things With Demetri Martin on Comedy Central. Later in June, it was announced his show had been renewed for a second season. The second season premiered, again on Comedy Central, on February 4, 2010. Martin has stated that Important Things will not return for a third season.
Prior to completing work on his second season, Martin starred in the comedy-drama film Taking Woodstock (2009), directed by Ang Lee, which premiered at the 2009 Cannes Film Festival. In the film Martin plays Elliot Tiber, a closeted gay artist who has given up his ambitions in the city to move upstate and help his old-world Jewish family run their Catskill Mountains motel. The film is based on the book written by Tiber.
On April 25, 2011, Martin released his first book, titled This Is a Book.
Martin played a small role in the 2011 film Contagion.

Martin sold his movie concept Will to DreamWorks, and is expected to play a key supporting role. He will play the lead in the film Moon People, a pitch that he sold to Columbia Pictures.
He also signed a blind script deal with CBS in October 2010 to produce, write, and star in his own television series. After CBS was shown the pilot for the series, they decided not to air it.

On October 2, 2012, Martin released his second comedy album entitled Demetri Martin. Standup Comedian.

Martin voices Ice Bear in the Cartoon Network series We Bare Bears, and the narrator in its spin-off series We Baby Bears. He wrote, directed, edited, and starred in the 2016 film Dean.

Comedic style 
Martin is known for being an unconventional stand-up comic. He uses one-liners and drawings on a "large pad", as well as accompanying his jokes with music on either guitar, harmonica, piano, keyboard, glockenspiel, toy bells, ukulele, or tambourine, sometimes all at once. His style is often compared to Mitch Hedberg. He has cited comedian Steven Wright as an important influence (both use deadpan one-liners in their acts) as well as The Far Side cartoonist Gary Larson. He has submitted cartoons to the New Yorker magazine at its invitation – and had them rejected. "You gotta get better at drawing. These aren't funny enough."

Martin plays instruments on stage and has music playing in the background of his performances as a way of preventing any editing of his performances to better fit for television. However, Martin has also confessed a desire to evolve his comedic style. "I love one-liners, I love jokes...but I also want to talk about how I feel. I want to talk about below-the-neck stuff. It's hard, if that's not where your head goes, it's hard to get comedy out of that...[But] I want to dig deeper, I want to connect in a different way with the audience."

Personal life 
According to a July 2011 interview on the podcast WTF with Marc Maron, Martin had a short-lived marriage with a former high school classmate named Jen. They began dating after high school and got married when he was at NYU Law School and she was attending NYU Medical School. This relationship was further analyzed in his one-man show Spiral Bound.

On June 1, 2012, Martin married his long-time girlfriend Rachael Beame in Santa Monica, California. They have a daughter named Eve and a son named Paul. They currently reside in Los Feliz, California.

Works

Albums & specials 
 If I (2004)
 These Are Jokes (2006)
 Demetri Martin. Person (2007)
 Standup Comedian. (2012)
 Live* *at the time (2015)
 The Overthinker (2018)
 I Feel Funny (TBA)

Other mediums 
Television shows

 Important Things with Demetri Martin (2009–2010)

Books
 This Is a Book, April 2011, .
 19 1/2 Stories, TBA
Art collections
 Point Your Face at This, March 2013, .
 If It's Not Funny It's Art, September 2017 .
Films

 Dean (2016)

Filmography

Awards and nominations

References

External links 
General
 
 
Interviews
 Interview from November, 2006, in The A.V. Club
 Interview from October 2006, in The DePaulia
 Interview by Brian M. Palmer
 MP3 Audio Interview on The Sound of Young America public radio show and podcast
 Interview Believer Mag

1973 births
Living people
21st-century American comedians
21st-century American male actors
21st-century American male writers
21st-century American screenwriters
American cartoonists
American comedy musicians
American comedy writers
American humorists
American male comedians
American male film actors
American male television actors
American male television writers
American male voice actors
American sketch comedians
American stand-up comedians
American television writers
American writers of Greek descent
Comedians from New York City
Male actors from New Jersey
Male actors from New York City
New York University School of Law alumni
People from Los Feliz, Los Angeles
People from Toms River, New Jersey
Screenwriters from New Jersey
Screenwriters from New York (state)
Toms River High School North alumni
Writers from New York City
Writers Guild of America Award winners
Yale University alumni